Miranda Van Eetvelde (born 24 September 1959 in Zele) is a Belgian politician and is affiliated to the N-VA. She was elected as a member of the Belgian Chamber of Representatives in 2010.

Notes

Living people
Members of the Chamber of Representatives (Belgium)
New Flemish Alliance politicians
1959 births
People from Zele
21st-century Belgian politicians
21st-century Belgian women politicians